Nathaniel Treat, Sr. (December 29, 1798 – February 4, 1894) was a member of the Maine House of Representatives.

Biography
Treat was born in Frankfort, Maine on December 29, 1798. He was a descendant of Robert Treat. In 1823, Treat married Mary P. Parker. They had ten children, including Joseph B. Treat, who became a member of the Wisconsin State Senate and chairman of the Republican State Central Committee. Treat built sawmills, served as a bank president, and became involved in the lumber industry. His former home in Orono, Maine, now known as the Nathaniel Treat House, is listed on the National Register of Historic Places. In 1870, Treat moved to Monroe, Wisconsin, where he died on February 4, 1894. His grandson, Charles Treat, became a major general in the United States Army. Treat and his family were Universalists.

Political career
Treat was a member of the House of Representatives in 1834. In addition, he was First Selectman of Orono. He was a Democrat.

References

External links
mainething.com

People from Frankfort, Maine
People from Orono, Maine
People from Monroe, Wisconsin
Businesspeople from Maine
Democratic Party members of the Maine House of Representatives
American Universalists
American bank presidents
Millers
1798 births
1894 deaths
19th-century American politicians
19th-century American businesspeople